Budak Lapok is a 2007 Malaysian animated film. Based on the P. Ramlee film Bujang Lapok, the film premiered on 13 October 2007 and was directed by Anwardi Datuk Jamil. It became the first Malaysian animated movie released in six years since Putih in 2001.

Plot
Ramlee, Ajis and Sudin are three kids who befriend one another in a small village called Kampong Sebatang Pinang. The three take part in a football game against defending champions Sekolah Kampong Semerah Padi led by naughty Sarip Dol. Meanwhile, the three boys are also planning to win the hearts of village lasses, Nani, Salmah and Eton, by taking part in the inter-school drama competition even though both Ajis and Sudin are fearful of appearing on stage. Things become complicated when both the drama competition and the soccer match fall on the same day. The three need to come out with a plan to be at two places at almost the same time.

Voice cast
 Aziz Sattar as Pak Ajis 
 S. Shamsuddin as Pak Sudin
 Mohd Hasrul Syafiq as Ramlee
 M. Hafidzuddin Mahmudi as Aziz 
 Eric Fuzi as Sudin 
 Shafique Danial as Sarip Dol 
 Al-Rusydi as Komeng 
 Abon as Wak Mustardjo 
 Afiqah as Sal 
 Isma Aliff as Osman
 Aqira	Aqira as Sarimah 
 S. Azli as Ahmad Nesfu 
 Mohd Rahim Dalmia as Koc Mahmud 
 Mawar Dina as Eton 
 Jalil Hamid as Tok Penghulu 
 Jasmin Hamid as Joyah 
 Maizurah Hamzah as Cikgu Rokiah 
 Vanida Imran as Emak Aziz/Normah 
 Harith Jalil as Tanggang 
 Jihan as Ibu Tanggang
 Nuralida as Nani 
 Mat Over as Pak Mat Tempe 
 Dian P. Ramlee as Emak Ramlee/Azizah 
 Nasir P. Ramlee as Bapak Ramlee/Zakaria 
 Syamir Sahak as Brahim 
 Salbalqish as Ros 
 Sathiyavarmaan as Ayam
 Sabri Yunus as Bapak Aziz/Sattar

Production
Animation process of the film was made in Bandung, Indonesia.

Release
Budak Lapok was released on October 10, 2007, during the Eid-ul-Fitr. It was a commercial failure.

The film was screened on Radio Television Malaysia (RTM) in 2010.

References

External links
 

2007 films
2007 animated films
Malaysian animated films
Remakes of Malaysian films